Haedropleura maitreja is an extinct species of sea snail, a marine gastropod mollusk in the family Horaiclavidae.

Description
The length of the shell attains 7.5 mm.

Distribution
This extinct species occurs in Miocene strata of Belgium, Denmark and Germany

References

External links
 Natural History Museum Rotterdam: Haedropleura maitreja

maitreja